This table lists all international variants in the television game show franchise Who Wants to Be a Millionaire? that have been broadcast since the debut of the original British version of the show on 4 September 1998.

International versions
Legend:

 Currently airing  
 No longer airing  
 Upcoming or returning version

"Is that your final answer?" catchphrases
The Millionaire franchise's catchphrase is "Is that your final answer?" (more commonly said by some versions' hosts as "Final answer?", "Chris' Final Answer" or simply "Final?"), a question derived from a rule requirement that the players must clearly indicate their choices before being made official (since the nature of the game allows the player to think aloud about the options before committing to an answer). As a side effect, once a final answer has been given, it cannot be changed. Many parodies of the game show capitalised on this phrase. However, not every version has taken over such a catchphrase so that the answer is stated rather informally in that case.

Players can prevent the host from asking this question, by stating themselves "final answer" or some variant after they declare their choice.

Another hallmark of the show is using dramatic pauses before the host acknowledges whether or not the answer was correct. Occasionally, the host will only announce if the answer is correct after the commercial break.

Notes

References

Television lists by series
Television franchises
Who Wants to Be a Millionaire?